Some Say No is a 2011 Italian comedy film directed by Giambattista Avellino.

Cast
 Luca Argentero as Max
 Paola Cortellesi as Irma
 Myriam Catania as Enza Giannotti
 Paolo Ruffini as Samuele
 Giorgio Albertazzi as Barone De Rolandis
 Claudio Bigagli as Leo Fenaroli
 Marco Bocci as Pino Conca
 Roberto Citran as Edmondo Giannotti
 Massimo De Lorenzo as Crocetta
 Isabelle Adriani
 Chiara Francini as Mara De Rolandis
 Edoardo Gabbriellini as Saguatti

References

External links
 

2011 films
2011 comedy films
Italian comedy films
2010s Italian-language films
2010s Italian films